This is a list of the National Register of Historic Places listings in Milam County, Texas.

This is intended to be a complete list of properties and districts listed on the National Register of Historic Places in Milam County, Texas. There are one district and four individual properties listed on the National Register in the county. Three individually listed properties are Recorded Texas Historic Landmarks while an additional property is a State Antiquities Landmark that includes two Recorded Texas Historic Landmarks.

Current listings

The publicly disclosed locations of National Register properties and districts may be seen in a mapping service provided.

|}

See also

National Register of Historic Places listings in Texas
Recorded Texas Historic Landmarks in Milam County

References

External links

Milam County, Texas
Milam County
Buildings and structures in Milam County, Texas